Darren T. Roulstone is John W. Berry, Sr. Fund for Faculty Excellence Professor of Accounting at Fisher College of Business at the Ohio State University in Columbus, Ohio, and has been  director of its Accounting and Management Information Systems PhD program since 2008. His current research interests are textual analysis of firms’ financial disclosures (specifically, earnings press releases) and how investors acquire accounting information.

Life and career 
Roulstone grew up on Vancouver Island in British Columbia, Canada. He received undergraduate and master's degrees in accounting from Brigham Young University in Utah.  He received his  PhD in accounting from Ross School of Business at the University of Michigan in 2000.

He joined the University of Chicago Booth School of Business as assistant professor in July 2000, and became associate professor in 2004. He joined Fisher College of Business at  Ohio State  in July 2008 as associate professor of Accounting.

Roulstone currently serves as an Associate Editor of the journal Management Science.

Research 
His recent work  investigates how firms talk about the future and how firms order the information in their press releases. Regulators encourage firms to provide future-oriented information, and Roulstone and his colleagues examined how firms do this and how this information affects market participants.

Selected publications 
According to Google Scholar, the following articles have been cited over 100 times, with one article cited for over 1000 times, and three articles cited for over 300 times:
 J Piotroski, D Roulstone (2004). The Influence of Analysts, Institutional Investors, and Insiders on the Incorporation of Market, Industry, and Firm-Specific Information into Stock Prices. The Accounting Review”, 79(4).
 JD Piotroski, DT Roulstone (2005). Do insider trades reflect both contrarian beliefs and superior knowledge about future cash flow realizations?. Journal of Accounting and Economics”, 39 (1), 55-81
 DT Roulstone (2003). Analyst following and market liquidity. “Contemporary Accounting Research”, 20 (3), 552-578.
 D Roulstone, M Drake, J Thornock (2012). Investor Information Demand: Evidence from Google Searches Around Earnings Announcements. Journal of Accounting Research.
 D Roulstone (2011). Discussion of "Large-Sample Evidence of Firms' Year-over-year MD&A Modifications. Journal of Accounting Research”, 49 (2), 347-357.
 DT Roulstone (2003). The Relation Between Insider‐Trading Restrictions and Executive Compensation. “Journal of Accounting Research”, 41 (3), 525-551.
 DT Roulstone (1999). [Effect of SEC Financial Reporting Release No. 48 on derivative and market risk disclosures]. “Accounting Horizons”, 13 (4), 343-363.
 MS Drake, DT Roulstone, JR Thornock (2015). The Determinants and Consequences of Information Acquisition via EDGAR. “Contemporary Accounting Research”, 32 (3), 1128-1161.
 S Crawford, D Roulstone, E So (2012). Analyst initiations of coverage and stock-return synchronicity. “The Accounting Review”, 87 (5), 1527-1553.

Awards 
 2019 Financial Accounting and Reporting Section (FARS), American Accounting Association Best Paper Award,
 2002 Ernest R. Wish Accounting Research Award—Booth

References

External links
 Faculty profile at Fisher College of Business
 Google Scholar profile

Management scientists
Ohio State University faculty
University of Chicago Booth School of Business faculty
Brigham Young University alumni
Ross School of Business alumni
Canadian emigrants to the United States
Living people
People from Vancouver Island
Year of birth missing (living people)